John Dezso Ratzenberger (born April 6, 1947) is an American actor, comedian and director. He is best known for playing the character Cliff Clavin on the comedy series Cheers, for which he earned two Primetime Emmy nominations. He also played a role in the short-lived spin-off The Tortellis and in an episode of Wings, which was made by the same creators. Ratzenberger voiced various characters in Pixar Animation Studios' feature films, including Hamm in the Toy Story franchise, The Abominable Snowman in the Monsters, Inc. franchise, Mack in the Cars franchise, The Underminer in The Incredibles franchise, and many others.

Ratzenberger began his entertainment career while living in London in the 1970s. He acted in and wrote film and television through the 1970s and early 1980s before returning to America. At an audition for a role in a new sitcom, Ratzenberger created the character of know-it-all mailman Cliff Clavin. Cheers (1982–1993) was a success and went on to run for 11 years. After Cheers, he began acting in voice roles for Pixar; his first role was as Hamm in Pixar's first feature film Toy Story (1995), and voiced other Pixar characters in every film and video game until 2020.

Early life
John Dezso Ratzenberger was born on Easter Sunday, April 6, 1947, in Bridgeport, Connecticut, the son of Bertha Veronica (née Grochowski), and Dezső Alexander Ratzenberger, a WWII veteran who had been a combat engineer in the Philippines. John's father, Dezso, was of Austrian and Hungarian descent, and John's mother was of Polish ancestry. Ratzenberger attended St. Ann's School in Bridgeport and then Sacred Heart University in Fairfield, Connecticut. In 1969, Ratzenberger worked at the Woodstock Festival, as a heavy equipment operator and as part of the crew building the stage. John moved to London in 1971 where he began his acting, writing, and directing career.

Career

Ratzenberger began his career in the performing arts while living in London, England. Through the 1970s, he performed with Ray Hassett as the comedic theatrical duo Sal's Meat Market, which toured throughout Europe for eight years.  Sal's Meat Market heavily influenced Peter Richardson and Nigel Planer as a duo in The Outer Limits and in The Comic Strip. His first role in a major feature film was as a patron in The Ritz (1976). Throughout the late 1970s and early 1980s, Ratzenberger appeared in various roles in feature films throughout Europe including: A Bridge Too Far, filmed in Holland, as Lieutenant James Megellas; Superman, as a missile controller; Superman II, as the NASA control man; Star Wars: The Empire Strikes Back as Major Derlin; Outland as a doomed mine worker named Tarlow; and Gandhi, filmed in India, playing an American lieutenant.

Cheers
Ratzenberger played mail carrier Cliff Clavin on the sitcom Cheers. As an improv artist, he asked the producers if they had written a bar know-it-all character; the producers decided it was a great idea, and the character of Cliff Clavin was born. Ratzenberger also came up with the idea for Cliff's trademark white socks, which he wore as a tribute to French comedian Jacques Tati. Cliff became known for his outlandish stories, trivia, and his trademarked (and oft repeated), "It's a little known fact..." Cliff and Norm, the primary customer characters of the iconic bar, Cheers, played buddies who met at Cheers to talk about the day or nothing in particular. Ratzenberger was nominated for an Emmy Award for Outstanding Supporting Actor in a Comedy Series in 1985 and again in 1986. Ratzenberger provided the voice for an animated version of Cliff on The Simpsons sixth-season episode "Fear of Flying". He also played the role in the short-lived spin-off The Tortellis and in an episode of Wings, which was made by the same creators.

Pixar
John Ratzenberger has had a voice role in each of Pixar's first 22 films. His roles include:
Hamm in the Toy Story series (1995, 1999, 2010, 2019)
P.T. Flea, the Circus Ring Leader in A Bug's Life (1998)
Yeti the Abominable Snowman in the Monsters, Inc. series (2001, 2013)
The school of Moonfish in Finding Nemo (2003)
The Underminer in The Incredibles series (2004, 2018)
Mack the truck in the Cars series (2006, 2011, 2017)
Mustafa the waiter in Ratatouille (2007)
John in WALL-E (2008)
Tom the construction worker in Up (2009)
Gordon the guard in Brave (2012)
Fritz in Inside Out (2015)
Earl the Velociraptor in The Good Dinosaur (2015)
Bill the crab in Finding Dory (2016)
Juan Ortodoncia in Coco (2017)
Fennwick the cyclops construction worker in Onward (2020)
John Ratzenberger's tenure at Pixar was parodied during the end credits of Cars, where his character, Mack, watches car-themed versions of Pixar films (Toy Car Story, Monster Trucks, Inc., and A Bug's Life, the latter of which references the Volkswagen Beetle). Mack notes that all the characters that John Ratzenberger has played had excellent voice actors until he realizes that they are performed by the same actor, at which point he remarks, "They're just using the same actor over and over," and asks, "What kind of cut-rate production is this?!"

Ratzenberger said that his favorite Pixar character was P.T. Flea, because "...in real life, I always get a kick out of those kinds of characters, people who just go into a rage for [no] explicable reason. He was always on edge. His blood pressure was always way over the top, and everything that he did was done in a panicked state. So it was a lot of fun to play him." John Ratzenberger voiced characters for other studios as well; he played Harland the Jet Tug in Disneytoon Studios' Planes (2013) and a mustached plane named Brodi in its sequel, Planes: Fire & Rescue (2014), Additionally, Ratzenberger reprised his role as the Abominable Snowman in the Disney+-exclusive series Monsters at Work, which is set after the events of Monsters, Inc. Ratzenberger has also voiced a character named Rootie in Skydance Animation's first film, Luck, which continues his collaboration in animation with former Pixar filmmaker John Lasseter.

Soul, Pixar's 23rd feature film, is the first Pixar film not to include Ratzenberger's voice or personal involvement. The film's director, Pete Docter, hinted to audiences that Ratzenberger makes a "cameo" in the film, but the cameo was subsequently confirmed by co-director Kemp Powers to be an animated appearance instead of a voice role, meaning Ratzenberger himself technically did not participate in the film. Docter subsequently explained on the audio commentary track for Soul'''s home media releases that he wanted to come up with something more subdued for Ratzenberger's cameo in the film rather than go the traditional route of having a voice cameo.

Personal life
Ratzenberger lived in London for 10 years. Since 1994, he has lived in Vashon, Washington. He married Georgia Stiny in 1984; during their 19 year marriage they had two children together before divorcing in 2004. He then married Julie Blichfeldt in November 2012.

He developed a packaging-alternatives product made from biodegradable and non-toxic recycled paper as a safe alternative to foam peanuts and plastic bubble wrap. This product, SizzlePak, was manufactured by his company Eco-Pak Industries, which he co-founded in 1989. In 1992 he sold Eco-Pack to Ranpak Corp.

Political views
Ratzenberger is a Republican. During the 2008 presidential race, Ratzenberger campaigned for John McCain, appearing with former Cheers co-star Kelsey Grammer at several Republican party events. He was outspoken in opposition of the 2010 health care reform bill, referring to it as socialism. On January 17, 2010, he appeared and endorsed Scott Brown for the United States Senate at Mechanics Hall in Worcester, Massachusetts. Ratzenberger campaigned for Republican Josh Mandel of Ohio for state treasurer in 2010 and served as master of ceremonies for Mandel's inauguration into the position in 2011. He considered running for the U.S. Senate in Connecticut in 2012.

Ratzenberger endorsed Mitt Romney in 2012. He appeared on Your World with Neil Cavuto'' to support Donald Trump's candidacy during the 2016 presidential race, shortly after Trump was declared the presumptive Republican nominee. He praised his performance as president in 2017, saying he had done "a wonderful job as far as manufacturing is concerned."

During the COVID-19 pandemic, Ratzenberger expressed his support for the United States Postal Service (USPS) in 2020 via Cameo and suggested people who wished to help them donate and buy presents for Christmas early.

Filmography

Film

Television

Video games

Musical

Production credits

References

External links 

Official website
 
 

1947 births
20th-century American male actors
21st-century American male actors
American expatriates in the United Kingdom
American male film actors
American male television actors
American male video game actors
American male voice actors
American people of Austrian descent
American people of Hungarian descent
American people of Polish descent
Connecticut Republicans
Living people
Male actors from Bridgeport, Connecticut
Participants in American reality television series
Pixar people
Sacred Heart University alumni